Granopothyne is a genus of beetles in the family Cerambycidae, containing the following species:

 Granopothyne granifrons Breuning, 1959
 Granopothyne palawana Vives, 2009

References

Agapanthiini